Terry Paul Beasley (born February 5, 1950) is a former American football player. He played collegiately at Auburn where he lettered from 1969 to 1971. In his college career, Beasley amassed 141 receptions, 2,507 yards and 29 touchdowns. He was an All-American as a wide receiver in 1970 and 1971. He led the Southeastern Conference in receptions, receiving yards and scoring in 1970 with 52 receptions, 1,051 receiving yards and 72 points. In 1971, he was named the College Pass Receiver of the Year by the Touchdown Club of Columbus. Beasley was elected into the College Football Hall of Fame in 2002.

Beasley was selected in the first round of the 1972 NFL Draft by the San Francisco 49ers, with whom he spent the duration of his short professional career before injuries forced his retirement following the 1975 season.
He was married to Joanne Teel. Had four daughters, Wendy, Jordan, Tara and Terry.

References 

1950 births
Living people
All-American college football players
American football wide receivers
Auburn Tigers football players
Players of American football from Montgomery, Alabama
College Football Hall of Fame inductees
San Francisco 49ers players